The 2008 IIHF World Championship was played between May 2 and May 18, 2008 in the Canadian cities of Halifax (Nova Scotia) and Quebec City (Quebec). The two venues were the Halifax Metro Centre and the Colisée Pepsi. The tournament was won by Russia which claimed its first gold medal since 1993.

It was the 72nd IIHF World Championship event, and was run by the International Ice Hockey Federation (IIHF). It was the first time the final tournament is held in a non-European country since 1962, when it was held in Colorado, USA. The IIHF wanted to celebrate the federation's 100th anniversary by holding the tournament in the country where ice hockey was born. The tournament was also included as part of the celebrations of Quebec City's 400th anniversary.

The tournament featured many countries' elite stars, as it served as the last and most important stage in selecting nine automatic qualifiers for the men's hockey competition at the 2010 Winter Olympics in Vancouver, British Columbia, Canada, a process that uses the IIHF World Ranking standings after the tournament.

On May 8, 2007, the IIHF announced it "will also formalize the Triple Gold Club by awarding commemorative medals to the 19 players who have won the three most prestigious championships in world hockey: Olympic gold, Stanley Cup, and World Championship gold. The ceremony will take place in Canada during the 2008 World Championship."

There were two changes in the format compared to earlier years. Because of the distance between Halifax and Quebec City, the quarter-finals were played within the group, instead of crossing over which has happened since 2000. The relegation round was different too, as it consisted of two best-of-three series instead of a round robin series between four teams.

For the first time in 40 years, the matches were played on smaller, NHL size rinks, 200 ft × 85 ft (roughly 61 m × 26 m), compared to the IIHF standard which is roughly 200 ft × 98.5 ft (61 m × 30 m).

Participating teams 

Group A
  (roster)
  (roster)
  (roster)
  (roster)

Group B
  (roster)
  (roster)
  (roster)
  (roster)

Group C
  (roster)
  (roster)
  (roster)
  (roster)

Group D
  (roster)
  (roster)
  (roster)
  (roster)

Venues

Rules 
For standing purposes, points shall be awarded as follows:
 3 points for a win in regulation time
 2 points for a win in overtime or in shootout
 1 point for a loss in overtime or in shootout
 No points for a loss in regulation time

If a game is tied after regulation time, a five-minute four-on-four sudden-death overtime session is played followed by a three-player shootout if necessary. Exceptions: quarter-finals, semi-final and bronze-medal overtime session are 10 minutes and gold-medal game overtime session is 20 minutes.

If teams are tied in a standing based on points, the following tie-breakers are applied:
1) The most points earned in direct games involving tied teams.
2) The best goal differential in direct games involving tied teams.
3) The most goals scored in direct games involving tied teams.
4) Follow steps 1, 2 and 3 with games involving the highest non-tied team in the same group.
5) Repeat step 4 with games involving the second highest non-tied team in the same group.
6) Continue this process with all non-tied team games.

This was also the first major IIHF championship that used the four-official system with two referees and two linesmen instead of standard three-official system with only one referee.

Preliminary round 
Sixteen participating teams were placed in the following four groups. After playing a round-robin, the top three teams in each group advanced to the Qualifying Round while the last team competed in the relegation round.

Group A 

All times are local (UTC-4).

Group B 

All times are local (UTC-3).

Group C 

All times are local (UTC-3).

Group D 

All times are local (UTC-4).

Qualifying round 
The top three teams in the standings of each group of the Preliminary Round advance to the Qualifying Round, and are placed in two groups: teams from Groups A and D compete in Group E, while teams from Groups B and C compete in Group F.

Each team is to play three games in this round, one against each of the three teams from the other group with which they have been paired. These three games, along with the two games already played against the other two advancing teams from the same group in the Preliminary Round, will count in the Qualifying Round standings.

The top four teams in both groups E and F to advance in quarter-finals.

Group E 

All times are local (UTC-4).

Group F 

All times are local (UTC-3).

Relegation round 
Teams finishing last in all four Preliminary Round groups competed in the Relegation Round in order to determine which two nations would be relegated to the IIHF World Championship Division I. The four teams were paired in two best-of-three series.

France defeated Italy, while Slovakia defeated Slovenia, both in 2 games, and secured themselves a place among the top sixteen hockey nations in the world. Italy and Slovenia were relegated to Division I for the 2009 tournament, and will be replaced by Austria and Hungary, the winners of the 2008 Division I tournament.

Group G

Series G1 
All times are local (UTC-4).

Series G2 
All times are local (UTC-3).

Playoff round

Draw

Quarter-finals 
All times are local (Quebec: UTC-4, Halifax: UTC-3).

Semi-finals 
All times are local (UTC-4)

Bronze-medal game 
All times are local (UTC-4)

Gold-medal game 

All times are local (UTC-4)

Ranking and statistics

Tournament Awards 
 Best players selected by the directorate:
 Best Goaltender:       Evgeni Nabokov
 Best Defenceman:       Brent Burns
 Best Forward:          Dany Heatley
 Most Valuable Player:  Dany Heatley
 Media All-Star Team:
 Goaltender:  Evgeni Nabokov
 Defence:     Mike Green,  Tomáš Kaberle
 Forward:     Dany Heatley,  Rick Nash,  Alexander Ovechkin

Final standings 
The final standings of the tournament according to IIHF:

Scoring leaders 
List shows the top 10 skaters sorted by points, then goals. If the list exceeds 10 skaters because of a tie in points, all of the tied skaters are left out.
GP = Games played; G = Goals; A = Assists; Pts = Points; +/- = Plus/minus; PIM = Penalties in minutes; POS = Position

Leading goaltenders 
Only the top 5 goaltenders, based on save percentage, who have played over 40% of their team's minutes are included in this list.
TOI = Time On Ice (minutes:seconds); SA = Shots against; GA = Goals against; GAA = Goals against average; Sv% = Save percentage; SO = Shutouts

IIHF Broadcasting rights 

 Austria: ORF Sport Plus
 Belarus: TV-First, LAD
 Canada:
 English: TSN
 French: RDS
 Czech Republic: Česká televize
 Denmark: TV2 Sport
 Finland: YLE
 France: Sport+
 Germany: DSF
 Hungary: Sport 1, Sport 2
 Iceland: RÚV
 Internet: Webcast at IIHF.com
 Italy: Rai Sport Satellite
 Latvia: TV3 Latvia, TV6 Latvia, 3+ Latvia
 Norway:
 Norwegian Matches: NRK
 Other Matches: SportN
 Poland: Polsat
 Romania: Sport 1, Sport 2
 Russia: VGTRK Sport
 Slovakia: STV
 Slovenia: RTV Slovenija
 Sweden: Viasat
 Switzerland:
 German: SF zwei
 French: TSR 2
 Italian: TSI 2
 USA: World Championship Sports Network

See also 

 2008 Men's World Ice Hockey Championships
 2008 IIHF World Championship Division I
 2008 IIHF World Championship Division II
 2008 IIHF World Championship Division III
 2008 IIHF World Championship Division III Qualification
 Juniors, Women's, Men's U18, Women's U18

References

External links 
 2008 Ice Hockey World Championship at Hockey Canada website
 IIHF.com

 
IIHF World Championship
1
International ice hockey competitions hosted by Canada
World
May 2008 sports events in Canada
Sports competitions in Quebec City
Ice hockey competitions in Halifax, Nova Scotia
2000s in Quebec City
21st century in Halifax, Nova Scotia
Ice hockey competitions in Quebec